Redwick could refer to:

Redwick, Gloucestershire, a village in England
Redwick, Newport, a village in south east Wales